The Montreal Open was a golf tournament on the Canadian Tour that was held in the Greater Montreal area, Quebec, Canada between 2004 and 2009.

Founded as the Greater Montreal Open in 2004, the event was sponsored by Lexus the following year and titled the Lexus Montreal Open. In 2006, Montreal Casino was the title sponsor and the tournament was designated as the Canadian Tour's "Players Championship". Between 2007 until it ended in 2009, it was sponsored by the Desjardins Group and titled as the Desjardins Montreal Open.

An earlier event with the same name was played in 1945 and won by Byron Nelson.

Winners

References

Former PGA Tour Canada events
Golf tournaments in Quebec
Recurring sporting events established in 2004
Recurring sporting events disestablished in 2009